Mirco Pruyser (born 11 August 1989) is a Dutch field hockey player who plays as a forward for Amsterdam. 

He participated at the 2016 Summer Olympics with the Dutch national team, where they finished fourth.

International career
He made his debut for the Dutch national team in 2014 and won his first medal with the national team at the 2015 European Championships. In June 2019, he was selected in the Netherlands squad for the 2019 EuroHockey Championship. They won the bronze medal by defeating Germany 4–0. He was the joint-topscorer with three other players at the tournament. After the 2020 Summer Olympics he announced his retirement from the national team.

References

External links

1989 births
Living people
People from Haarlemmermeer
Dutch male field hockey players
Male field hockey forwards
Field hockey players at the 2016 Summer Olympics
Field hockey players at the 2020 Summer Olympics
2018 Men's Hockey World Cup players
Olympic field hockey players of the Netherlands
Amsterdamsche Hockey & Bandy Club players
Men's Hoofdklasse Hockey players
Sportspeople from North Holland
21st-century Dutch people